Neocollyris aptera is a species of ground beetle in the genus Neocollyris in the family Carabidae. It was described by Lund in 1790.

References

Aptera, Neocollyris
Beetles described in 1790